The Norman R. "Bud" Poile Trophy was awarded annually to the International Hockey League player selected as most valuable in the Turner Cup playoffs. The trophy has been awarded since the retirement of its namesake, former IHL commissioner, Bud Poile.

Winners

References
Norman R. "Bud" Poile Trophy www.hockeydb.com

International Hockey League (1945–2001) trophies